Anthony Stevens (born 1971) is a former Australian rules footballer.

Anthony Stevens or Tony Stevens may also refer to:
Anthony Stevens (Jungian analyst) (born 1933), Jungian analyst
Anthony Stevens-Arroyo (born 1941), American scholar of religion
T. C. Stevens (born 1987), American football player
Tony Stevens (born 1949), English musician
Tony Stevens (choreographer) (1948–2011), American choreographer, dancer, and director

See also 
Anthony Steven (1916–1990), English television screenwriter